Sir Maurice Levy, 1st Baronet, JP, DL (9 June 1859 – 26 August 1933) was a British Liberal Party politician.

Early life
Levy was born in 1859 in Leicester. He was the second son of Joseph Levy of Leicester and elder brother of Arthur Lever, who was also a Liberal MP. and educated at London University.

Career
He was Managing Director of Hart and Levy (Limited), wholesale merchants and manufacturers, of Leicester and London.

He was Liberal MP for the Loughborough Division of Leicestershire from 1900–18, first contesting the seat as the Liberal candidate at the 1900 General Election when he narrowly held the seat for the Liberals. He was active in parliament opposing the Aliens Act 1905 which sought to restrict Jewish immigration from eastern Europe. He was re-elected at the following three general elections. He was knighted in 1907 and created first Levy Baronet, of Humberstone Hall in the County of Leicester, in 1913. During World War One he worked under David Lloyd George at the Ministry of Munitions and was a member of Lloyd George's special trade mission to Ireland.

He retired from parliament without contesting the 1918 general election. and became a Justice of the Peace in the County of Leicester. He was appointed a Deputy Lieutenant for Leicestershire and served as High Sheriff of Leicestershire for 1926–27.

Personal life
In 1885, Levy was married to Elise Ray Zossenheim, a daughter of Max Zossenheim, of Leeds and Harrogate, and they lived at Humberstone Hall in Humberstone, Leicester. Together, they had one son, who inherited the baronetcy, and four daughters (Violet, Doris, Alex, and Norah), including.

 Sir Ewart Maurice Levy, 2nd Baronet (1897–1996), who married Hylda Levy, a daughter of Sir Albert Levy, founder of the Ardath Tobacco Company, Ltd., and one of Britain's best known philanthropists, in 1932.

Sir Maurice died on 26 August 1933 while on holiday at Brighton and was buried at Golders Green.

References

External links 
http://hansard.millbanksystems.com/people/sir-maurice-levy/

1859 births
1933 deaths
Politicians from Leicester
Alumni of the University of London
English Jews
Liberal Party (UK) MPs for English constituencies
Members of the Parliament of the United Kingdom for Loughborough
UK MPs 1900–1906
High Sheriffs of Leicestershire
Deputy Lieutenants of Leicestershire
English justices of the peace
Jewish British politicians
Baronets in the Baronetage of the United Kingdom
UK MPs 1906–1910
UK MPs 1910
UK MPs 1910–1918
19th-century English politicians
20th-century English politicians